An effects unit or effects pedal is an electronic device that alters the sound of a musical instrument or other audio source through audio signal processing.

Common effects include distortion/overdrive, often used with electric guitar in electric blues and rock music; dynamic effects such as volume pedals and compressors, which affect loudness; filters such as wah-wah pedals and graphic equalizers, which modify frequency ranges; modulation effects, such as chorus, flangers and phasers; pitch effects such as pitch shifters; and time effects, such as reverb and delay, which create echoing sounds and emulate the sound of different spaces.

Most modern effects use solid-state electronics or digital signal processors. Some effects, particularly older ones such as Leslie speakers and spring reverbs, use mechanical components or vacuum tubes. Effects are often used as stompboxes, typically placed on the floor and controlled with footswitches. They may also be built into guitar amplifiers, instruments (such as the Hammond B-3 organ), tabletop units designed for DJs and record producers, and rackmounts, and are widely used as audio plug-ins in such common formats as VST, AAX, and AU.

Musicians, audio engineers and record producers use effects units during live performances or in the studio, typically with electric guitar, bass guitar, electronic keyboard or electric piano. While effects are most frequently used with electric or electronic instruments, they can be used with any audio source, such as acoustic instruments, drums, and vocals.

Terminology

An effects unit is also called an effect box, effects device, effects processor or simply an effect. The abbreviation F/X or FX is sometimes used. A pedal-style unit may be called a stomp box, stompbox, effects pedal or pedal. Unprocessed audio coming into an effects unit is referred to as dry, while the processed audio output is referred to as wet.

A musician bringing many pedals to a live show or recording session often mounts the pedals on a guitar pedalboard, to reduce set-up and tear-down time and, for pedalboards with lids, protect the pedals during transportation. When a musician has multiple effects in a rack mounted road case, this case may be called an effects rack or rig. When rackmounted effects are mounted in a roadcase, this also speeds up a musician's set-up and tear-down time, because all of the effects can be connected together inside the rack case.

Form factors
Effects units are available in a variety of form factors. Stompboxes are used in both live performance and studio recording. Rackmount devices saw a heavy usage during the later 20th century, due to their superior processing power and desirable tones as compared to pedal-style units. However, by the 21st century, with the advent of digital plugins and more powerful stompboxes for live usage, the use of rack-mounted effect units has declined. An effects unit can consist of analog or digital electronics or a combination of the two. During a live performance, the effect is plugged into the electrical signal path of the instrument. In the studio, an instrument or another sound source — possibly an auxiliary output of a mixer or a DAW — is patched into the effect. Whatever the form factor, effects units are part of a studio or musician's outboard gear.

Stompboxes 

Stompboxes are small plastic or metal chassis which usually lie on the floor or in a pedalboard to be operated by the user's feet.  Pedals are often rectangle-shaped, but there are a range of other shapes (e.g., the circular Fuzz Face). Typical simple stompboxes have a single footswitch, one to three potentiometers for controlling the effect, and a single LED that indicates if the effect is on. A typical distortion or overdrive pedal's three potentiometers, for example, control the level or intensity of the distortion effect, the tone of the effected signal and the output level of the effected signal. Depending on the type of pedal, the potentiometers may control different parameters of the effect. For a chorus effect, for example, the knobs may control the depth and speed of the effect. Complex stompboxes may have multiple footswitches, many knobs, additional switches or buttons that are operated with the fingers, and an alphanumeric LED display that indicates the status of the effect with short acronyms (e.g., DIST for "distortion").

An effects chain or signal chain is formed by connecting two or more stompboxes. Effect chains are typically created between the guitar and the amp or between the preamplifier and the power amp. When a pedal is off or inactive, the electric audio signal coming into the pedal diverts onto a bypass, an unaltered dry signal that continues on to other effects down the chain. In this way, a musician can combine effects within a chain in a variety of ways without having to reconnect boxes during a performance.
A controller or effects management system lets the musician create multiple effect chains, so they can select one or several chains by tapping a single switch. The switches are usually organized in a row or a simple grid.

It is common to put compression, wah and overdrive pedals at the start of the chain; modulation (chorus, flanger, phase shifter) in the middle; and time-based units (delay/echo, reverb at the end. When using many effects, unwanted noise and hum can be introduced into the sound. Some performers use a noise gate pedal at the end of a chain to reduce unwanted noise and hum introduced by overdrive units or vintage gear.

Rackmounts

Rackmount effects units are typically built in a thin metal chassis with rack ears designed to be screw-mounted into the rack rails of a 19-inch rack that is standard to the music technology industry. Rackmount effects have a standardized 19-inch width, and height of 1 or more rack unit(s). Devices that are less than 19 inches wide can sometimes be made rackmount-compatible via special rackmount adapters.

A rackmount effects unit may contain electronic circuitry identical to a stompbox's, although its circuits are typically more complex. Unlike stompboxes, rackmounts usually have several different types of effects. Rackmount effects units are controlled by knobs, switches or buttons on their front panel, and often remote-controllable by a MIDI digital control interface or pedal-style foot controller.

Rackmount effects units are most commonly used in recording studios and front of house live sound mixing situations. Musicians may use them in place of stompboxes, as use of a rack can offer space for conveniently mounting additional rackmount equipment or accessories. Rackmounted effects units are typically mounted in a rack, which may be housed within a road case, a durable case with removable access panels that protect the equipment within during transportation. Because of this, rackmount effect units are not always designed with durable protective features such as corner protectors which are used on stompboxes and amps that are designed to be transported as standalone units.

Multi-effects and tabletop units

A multi-effects (MFX) device is a single electronics effects pedal or rackmount device that contains many different electronic effects. multi-effects devices allow users to preset combinations of different effects, allowing musicians quick on-stage access to different effects combinations. Multi-effects units typically have a range of distortion, chorus, flanger, phaser, delay, looper and reverb effects. Pedal-style multi-effects range from fairly inexpensive stompboxes that contain two pedals and a few knobs to control the effects to large, expensive floor units with many pedals and knobs. Rack-mounted multi-effects units may be mounted in the same rack as preamplifiers and power amplifiers.

A tabletop unit is a type of multi-effects device that sits on a desk and is controlled manually. One such example is the Pod guitar amplifier modeler. Digital effects designed for DJs are often sold in tabletop models, so that the units can be placed alongside a DJ mixer, turntables and scratching gear.

Built-in units

Effects are often incorporated into instrument amplifiers and even some types of instruments. Electric guitar amplifiers typically have built-in reverb, chorus and distortion, while acoustic guitar and keyboard amplifiers tend to only have built-in reverb. Some acoustic instrument amplifiers have reverb, chorus, compression and equalization (bass and treble) effects. Vintage guitar amps typically have tremolo and vibrato effects, and sometimes reverb. The Fender Bandmaster Reverb amp, for example, had built-in reverb and vibrato. Built-in effects may offer the user less control than standalone pedals or rackmounted units. For example, on some lower- to mid-priced bass amplifiers, the only control on the audio compression effect is a button or switch to turn it on or off, or a single knob. In contrast, a pedal or rackmounted unit would typically provide ratio, threshold and attack controls or other options to allow the user additional control over the compression.

Some guitar amplifiers have built-in multi-effects units or digital amplifier modeling effects. Bass amplifiers are less likely to have built-in effects, although some may have a compressor/limiter or fuzz bass effect.

Instruments with built-in effects include Hammond organs, electronic organs, electronic pianos and digital synthesizers. Built-in effects for keyboards typically include reverb, chorus and, for Hammond organ, vibrato. Many clonewheel organs include an overdrive effect. Occasionally, acoustic-electric and electric guitars will have built-in effects, such as a preamp or equalizer.

History

Studio effects and early stand-alone units
The earliest sound effects were strictly used in studio productions. Microphones placed in echo chambers with specially designed acoustic properties simulated the sound of live performances in different environments. In the mid to late 1940s, recording engineers and experimental musicians such as Les Paul began manipulating reel-to-reel recording tape to create echo effects and unusual, futuristic sounds. In 1948, DeArmond released the Trem-Trol, the first commercially available stand-alone effects unit. This device produced a tremolo by passing an instrument's electrical signal through a water-based electrolytic fluid. Most stand-alone effects of the 1950s and early 1960s such as the Gibson GA-VI vibrato unit and the Fender reverb box, were expensive and impractical, requiring bulky transformers and high voltages. The original stand-alone units were not especially in-demand as many effects came built into amplifiers. The first popular stand-alone was the 1958 Watkins Copicat, a relatively portable tape echo effect made famous by the British band, The Shadows.

Amplifiers

Effects built into tube-powered guitar amplifiers were the first effects that musicians used regularly outside the studio. From the late 1940s onward, the Gibson began including vibrato circuits in combo amplifiers that incorporated one or more speakers with the amp. The 1950 Ray Butts EchoSonic amp was the first to feature a tape echo, which quickly became popular with guitarists such as Chet Atkins, Carl Perkins, Scotty Moore, Luther Perkins, and Roy Orbison. Both Premier and Gibson built amplifiers with spring reverb. Fender began manufacturing the tremolo amps Tremolux in 1955 and Vibrolux in 1956.

Distortion was not an effect originally intended by amplifier manufacturers, but could often easily be achieved by overdriving the power supply in early tube amplifiers. In the 1950s, guitarists began deliberately increasing gain beyond its intended levels to achieve warm distorted sounds. Among the first musicians to experiment with distortion were Willie Johnson of Howlin' Wolf, Goree Carter, Joe Hill Louis, Ike Turner, Guitar Slim, and Chuck Berry.

In 1954, Pat Hare produced heavily distorted power chords for several recordings (including James Cotton's "Cotton Crop Blues"), creating "a grittier, nastier, more ferocious electric guitar sound," accomplished by turning the volume knob on his amplifier "all the way to the right until the speaker was screaming." Link Wray's 1958 recording "Rumble" inspired young musicians such as Pete Townshend of The Who, Jimmy Page of Led Zeppelin, Jeff Beck, Dave Davies of The Kinks, and Neil Young to explore distortion by various means. In 1966, the British company Marshall Amplification began producing the Marshall 1963, a guitar amplifier capable of producing the distorted crunch that rock musicians were starting to seek.

Stompboxes

The electronic transistor finally made it possible to cram the aural creativity of the recording studio into small, highly portable stompbox units. Transistors replaced vacuum tubes, allowing for much more compact formats and greater stability. The first transistorized guitar effect was the 1962 Maestro Fuzz Tone pedal, which became a sensation after its use in the 1965 Rolling Stones hit "(I Can't Get No) Satisfaction".

Warwick Electronics manufactured the first wah-wah pedal, The Clyde McCoy, in 1967 and that same year Roger Mayer developed the first octave effect, which Jimi Hendrix named "Octavio". Upon first hearing the Octavia, Hendrix allegedly rushed back to the studio and immediately used it to record the guitar solos on "Purple Haze" and "Fire". In 1968, Univox began marketing Shin-ei's Uni-Vibe pedal, an effect designed by noted audio engineer Fumio Mieda that mimicked the odd phase shift and chorus effects of the Leslie rotating speakers used in Hammond organs. The pedals soon became favorite effects of guitarists Jimi Hendrix and Robin Trower. In 1976, Roland subsidiary Boss Corporation released the CE-1 Chorus Ensemble, the first chorus pedal, created by taking a chorus circuit from an amplifier and putting it into a stompbox. By the mid-1970s a variety of solid-state effects pedals including flangers, chorus pedals, ring modulators and phase shifters were available.

In the 1980s, digital rackmount units began replacing stompboxes as the effects format of choice. Often musicians would record "dry", unaltered tracks in the studio and effects would be added in post-production. The success of Nirvana's 1991 album Nevermind helped to re-ignite interest in stompboxes. Some grunge guitarists would chain several fuzz pedals together and plug them into a tube amplifier. Throughout the 1990s, musicians committed to a "lo-fi" aesthetic such as J Mascis of Dinosaur Jr., Stephen Malkmus of Pavement and Robert Pollard of Guided by Voices continued to use analog effects pedals.

Effects and effects units—stompboxes in particular—have been celebrated by pop and rock musicians in album titles, songs and band names. The Big Muff, a fuzzbox manufactured by Electro-Harmonix, is commemorated by the Depeche Mode song "Big Muff" and the Mudhoney EP Superfuzz Bigmuff. Nine Inch Nails, Pink Floyd, George Harrison, They Might Be Giants and Joy Division are among the many musicians who have referenced effects units in their music.

Types

Distortion

Distortion, overdrive, and fuzz effects units add a "warm", "gritty", or "fuzzy" character to an audio signal by re-shaping or "clipping" it, which distorts the shape of its wave form by flattening its peaks, creating "warm" sounds by adding harmonics or "gritty" sounds by adding inharmonic overtones. Distortion effects are sometimes called "gain" effects, as distorted guitar sounds were first achieved by increasing the gain of tube amplifiers.

While distortion effects units produce perfectly flattened peaks or "hard" clipping, overdrive effects units produce "soft" tube-like distortion by compressing the sine wave without completely flattening it. Much like guitar tube amplifiers, overdrive effects units are capable of producing "clean" sounds at quieter volumes and distorted "warm" sounds at louder volumes.

Notable examples of distortion and overdrive effects units include the Boss DS-1 Distortion, Ibanez Tube Screamer, Marshall ShredMaster, MXR Distortion +, and Pro Co RAT.

A fuzz pedal, or fuzzbox, is a type of overdrive effects unit that clips a sound-wave until it is nearly a squarewave, resulting in a heavily distorted or "fuzzy" sound. Fuzzboxes may contain frequency multiplier circuitry to achieve a harsh timbre by adding complex harmonics. The Rolling Stones' song "(I Can't Get No) Satisfaction", with a fuzz effect featured prominently on the main electric guitar riff played by Keith Richards, greatly popularized the use of fuzz effects. Fuzz bass (also called "bass overdrive") is a style of playing the electric bass that produces a buzzy, overdriven sound via a tube or transistor amp or by using a fuzz or overdrive pedal.

Notable examples of fuzz effect units include the: Arbiter Fuzz Face, Electro-Harmonix Big Muff, Shin-ei Companion FY-2, Univox Super-Fuzz, Vox Tone Bender, Z.Vex Fuzz Factory.

While distortion effect units are most associated with electric and bass guitar, they are also commonly used on keyboard instruments (i.e. synthesizers, combo and tonewheel organs, electric piano), as well as drums and vocals. Distortion and overdrive effects units may either be transistor-based or digital.

Dynamics

Also called volume and amplitude effects, dynamics effects modify the volume of an instrument. Dynamics effects were among the first effects introduced to guitarists.

Boost/volume pedal: A boost or "clean boost" pedal amplifies the volume of an instrument by increasing the amplitude of its audio signal. These units are generally used for "boosting" volume during solos and preventing signal loss in long "effects chains". A guitarist switching from rhythm guitar to lead guitar for a guitar solo may use a boost to increase the volume of their solo.

Treadle-based volume pedals are used by electric instrument players (guitar, bass, keyboards) to adjust the volume of their instrument with one foot while their hands are being used to play their instrument. Treadle-style volume pedals are often also used to create swelling effects by removing the attack of a note or chord, as popularised by pedal steel guitar players. This enables electric guitar and pedal steel players to imitate the soft swelling sound that an orchestra string section can produce, in which a note or chord starts very softly and then grows in volume. Treadle-based volume pedals do not usually have batteries or require external power.
Volume effects: Electro-Harmonix LPB-1, Fender Volume Pedal, MXR Micro Amp, Ernie Ball Volume Pedal.

Compressor: Compressors make loud sounds quieter and quiet sounds louder by decreasing or "compressing" the dynamic range of an audio signal. A compressor is often used to stabilize volume and smooth a note's "attack" by dampening its onset and amplifying its sustain. A compressor can also function as a limiter with extreme settings of its controls.

Compressor effects: Keeley Compressor, MXR Dyna Comp, Boss CS-3 Compression Sustainer.

Noise gate: Noise gates attenuate hum, hiss, and static in the signal by greatly diminishing the volume when the signal falls below a set threshold. Noise gates are often used by electric guitarist who play with vintage amps, which can have unwanted hum in the tone, and by guitarists from heavy metal who use high distortion levels, which add noise to the signal even when no notes are being played. Noise gates mute the signal when it falls below a certain threshold. This means that during bars of rest for the guitarist in a song, the hum or noise from the amp or distortion pedal will not be heard by the audience. Noise gates are expanders—meaning that, unlike compressors, they increase the dynamic range of an audio signal to make quiet sounds even quieter. If used with extreme settings and combined with reverb, they can create unusual sounds, such as the gated drum effect used in 1980s pop songs, a style popularized by the Phil Collins song In the Air Tonight.

Noise gate effects: Boss NS-2 Noise Suppressor.

Filter

Filter effects alter the frequency content of an audio signal that passes through them by either boosting or weakening specific frequencies or frequency regions.

Equalizer: An equalizer is a set of linear filters that strengthen ("boost") or weaken ("cut") specific frequency regions. While basic home stereos often have equalizers for two bands, to adjust bass and treble, professional graphic equalizers offer much more targeted control over the audio frequency spectrum. Audio engineers use highly sophisticated equalizers to eliminate unwanted sounds, make an instrument or voice more prominent, and enhance particular aspects of an instrument's tone.

Equalizer effects: Boss GE-7 Equalizer, MXR 10-band EQ Pedal.

Talk box: A talk box directs the sound from an electric guitar or synthesizer into the mouth of a performer using a tube, allowing the sound to be shaped into vowels and consonants with movements of the mouth. The modified sound is then picked up by a microphone. In this way the guitarist is able create the effect that the guitar "licks" are "talking". Some famous uses of the talkbox include Bon Jovi's "Livin' on a Prayer", Stevie Wonder's "Black Man", Mötley Crüe's "Kickstart My Heart", Joe Walsh's "Rocky Mountain Way", Alice in Chains's "Man in the box" and Peter Frampton's "Show Me the Way".

Talk boxes: Dunlop HT1 Heil Talk Box, Rocktron Banshee.

Wah-wah: A wah-wah pedal creates vowel-like sounds by altering the frequency spectrum produced by an instrument—i.e., how loud it is at each separate frequency—in what is known as a "spectral glide" or "sweep".
The device is operated by a foot treadle that opens and closes a potentiometer. Wah-wah pedals are often used by funk and rock guitarists.

Wah effects: Dunlop Cry Baby, Morley Power Wah, Vox V846 Wah.

Auto-wah: A filter effect that is controlled by the volume of the input signal.  The most common filter type used for this effect pedal is the low-pass filter, although many pedal designs include a toggle for band-pass or high-pass filters as well.  Additionally, most envelope filters pedal boxes can switch between a down filter mode and an up filter.  This effect is commonly used in funk, reggae and jam band music.

Envelope filter effects: Musitronics Mu-Tron III, Electro-Harmonix Q-Tron Plus, DOD Envelope Filter 440

Modulation

Modulation, in general electronics, means the altering of signal strength. In audio devices, modulation is a control feature that varies the strength of some effect over time to alter tonal properties. Some modulation effects mix ("modulate") an instrument's audio signal with a signal generated by the effect called a carrier wave. Other modulation effects split an instrument's audio signal in two, altering one portion of the signal and mixing it with the unaltered portion.

Chorus: Chorus pedals mimic the effect choirs and string orchestras produce naturally, by having slight variations in timbre and pitch, by mixing sounds with slight differences in timbre and pitch. A chorus effect splits the instrument-to-amplifier audio signal, and adds a slight delay and frequency variations or vibrato to part of the signal while leaving the rest unaltered. A well-known usage of chorus is the lead guitar in "Come As You Are" by Nirvana.

Chorus effects: Boss CE-1 Chorus Ensemble, Electro-Harmonix Small Clone, TC Electronic Stereo Chorus.

Flanger: A flanger creates a "whooshing" "jet plane" or "spaceship" sound, simulating a studio effect that was first produced by recording a track on two synchronized tapes and periodically slowing one tape by pressing the edge of its reel (the "flange"). When the two tapes' audio signals are later mixed, a comb filter effect can be heard. Flanger units add a variably delayed version of the audio signal to the original or signal, creating a comb filter or Doppler effect. Some famous uses of flanger effects include "Walking on the Moon" by The Police, the intro to "Ain't Talkin' 'Bout Love" by Van Halen, and "Barracuda" by Heart.

Flanger effects: Electro-Harmonix Electric Mistress, MXR Flanger, Boss BF-3 Flanger.

Phaser: A phaser or "phase shifter" creates a slight rippling effect—amplifying some aspects of the tone while diminishing others—by splitting an audio signal in two and altering the phase of one portion. Three well-known examples of phaser are the two handed tapping part on the Van Halen instrumental "Eruption" and the keyboard parts on Billy Joel's "Just the Way You Are" and Paul Simon's "Slip Slidin' Away".

Phase shift effects: Uni-Vibe, Electro-Harmonix Small Stone, MXR Phase 90.

Ring modulator: A ring modulator produces a resonant, metallic sound by mixing an instrument's audio signal with a carrier wave generated by the device's internal oscillator. The original sound wave is suppressed and replaced by a "ring" of inharmonic higher and lower pitches or "sidebands". A notable use of ring modulation is the guitar in the Black Sabbath song "Paranoid".

Ring modulator effects: Moogerfooger MF-102 Ring Modulator.

Tremolo: A tremolo effect produces a slight, rapid variation in the volume of a note or chord. The "tremolo effect" should not be confused with the misleadingly-named tremolo bar, a device on a guitar bridge that creates a vibrato or pitch-bending effect. In transistorized effects, a tremolo is produced by modulating an instrument's audio signal with a sub-audible carrier wave in such a way that generates amplitude variations in the sound wave. Tremolo effects are built-in effects in some vintage guitar amplifiers. The guitar intro in the Rolling Stones' "Gimme Shelter" features a tremolo effect.

Tremolo effects: Demeter TRM-1 Tremulator, Fender Tremolux.

Slicer: Combines a modulation sequence with a noise gate or envelope filter to create a percussive and rhythmic effect like a helicopter.

Vibrato: Vibrato effects produce slight, rapid variations in pitch, mimicking the fractional semitone variations produced naturally by opera singers and violinists when they are prolonging a single note. Vibrato effects often allow the performer to control the rate of the variation as well as the difference in pitch (e.g. "depth"). A vibrato with an extreme "depth" setting (e.g., half a semitone or more) will produce a dramatic, ululating sound. In transistorized effects, vibrato is produced by mixing an instrument's audio signal with a carrier wave in such a way that generates frequency variations in the sound wave. Guitarists often use the terms vibrato and "tremolo" misleadingly. A so-called "vibrato unit" in a guitar amplifier actually produces tremolo, while a "tremolo arm" or "whammy bar" on a guitar produces vibrato.

Vibrato effects: Boss VB-2 Vibrato.

Pitch/frequency

Pitch/frequency effects modify pitch by altering the frequency of a sound wave or sound signal or adding new harmonies.

Pitch shifter and harmonizer" A pitch shifter (also called an "octaver" for effects that shift pitch by an octave) raises or lowers (e.g. "transposes") each note a performer plays by a pre-set interval. For example, a pitch shifter set to increase the pitch by a fourth will raise each note four diatonic intervals above the notes actually played. Simple, less expensive pitch shifters raise or lower the pitch by one or two octaves, while more sophisticated and expensive devices offer a range of interval alterations. A pitch shifter can be used by an electric guitarist to play notes that would normally only be available on an electric bass. As well, a bass player with a four string electric bass can use an octave pedal to obtain low notes that would normally only be obtainable with a five-string bass with a low "B" string.

A harmonizer is a type of sophisticated pitch shifter that combines the altered pitch with the original pitch to create a two note harmony based on the original pitch, or even with some pedals, three note harmony. Some hamonizers are able to create chorus-like effects by adding very tiny shifts in pitch.

Pitch shift effects: DigiTech Whammy, Electro-Harmonix POG.

Time-based
Time-based effects delay the sound signal, add reverb or echos, or, if a long delay is possible, enable musicians to record "loops".

Delay/echo: Delay/echo units produce an echo effect by adding a duplicate instrument-to-amplifier electrical signal to the original signal at a slight time-delay. The effect can either be a single echo called a "slap" or "slapback", or multiple echos. A well-known use of delay is the lead guitar in the U2 song "Where the Streets Have No Name", and also the opening riff of "Welcome to the Jungle" by Guns N' Roses.

Delay effects: Boss DD-3 Digital Delay, MXR Carbon Copy, Electro-Harmonix Deluxe Memory Man, Line 6 DL4, Roland RE-201.

Looper pedal: A looper pedal or "phrase looper" allows a performer to record and later replay a phrase, riff or passage from a song. Loops can be created on the spot during a performance (live looping) or they can be pre-recorded. By using a looper pedal, a singer-guitarist in a one person band can play the backing chords (or riffs) to a song, loop them with the pedal, and then sing and do a guitar solo over the chords. Some units allow a performer to layer multiple loops, enabling the performer to create the effect of a full band. The first loop effects were created with reel-to-reel tape using a tape loop. High-end boutique tape loop effects are still used by some studio producers who want a vintage sound. Digital loop effects recreate this effect using an electronic memory.

Reverb: Reverb units simulate the spacious sounds produced naturally in a huge stone cathedral (or other acoustic space such as a hall or room). This is done by creating a large number of echoes that gradually fade away in volume or "decay". One early technique for creating a reverb effect was to send an amplified signal of the music via a speaker to another room with reflective surfaces, such as a tile bathroom, and then record the natural reverberations that were produced. A plate reverb system uses an electromechanical transducer to create vibrations in a plate of metal. Spring reverb systems, which are often used in guitar amplifiers, use a transducer to create vibrations in a spring. Digital reverb effects use various signal processing algorithms to create the reverb effect, often by using multiple feedback delay circuits. Rockabilly and surf guitar are two genres that make heavy use of reverb.

Reverb effects: Electro-Harmonix Holy Grail, Fender Reverb Unit.

Feedback/sustain

Audio feedback: Audio feedback is an effect produced when amplified sound is picked up by a microphone or guitar pickup and played back through a guitar amplifier, initiating a "feedback loop", which usually consists of high-pitched sound. Feedback that occurs from a vocal mic into a PA system is almost always avoided. However, in some styles of rock music, electric guitar players intentionally create feedback by playing their instrument directly in front of a heavily amplified, distorted guitar amplifier's speaker enclosure. The creative use of feedback effects was pioneered by guitarists such as Jimi Hendrix in the 1960s. This technique creates sustained, high-pitched overtones and unusual sounds not possible through regular playing techniques. Guitar feedback effects can be difficult to perform, because it is difficult to determine the sound volume and guitar position relative to a guitar amp's loudspeaker necessary for achieving the desired feedback sound. Guitar feedback effects are used in a number of rock genres, including psychedelic rock, heavy metal music and punk rock.

EBow is a brand name of Heet Sound Products, of Los Angeles, California, for a small, handheld, battery-powered resonator. The Ebow was invented by Greg Heet, as a way to make a note on an electric guitar string resonate continuously, creating an effect that sounds similar to a bowed violin note or a sustained pipe organ note. The resonator uses a pickup – inductive string driver – feedback circuit, including a sensor coil, driver coil, and amplifier, to induce forced string resonance. The Ebow brand resonator is monophonic, and drives only one string at a time.

Other handheld and mounted guitar and bass resonators have been on the market since the early 1990s, produced in Germany under the SRG brand, which ceased production in 2016, and were available in both monophonic (one string at a time) and polyphonic (multiple strings at a time) models, which included multiple onboard trigger switch effects, such as HPF (high pass filter) for enhancing harmonics and producing feedback effects, and LPF (low pass filter), producing a bass boost with a cello sound on heavy gauge strings.
Later EBow models, such as the plus Ebow, contain a mode slide switch on the back, which allows the player to either produce just sustain or overtone feedback in addition to sustain.
Pedals such as the Boss DF-2 and FB-2 use an internally generated signal matched to the pitch of the guitar that can be sustained indefinitely by depressing the pedal.
Many compressor pedals are often also marketed as "sustainer pedals". As a note is sustained, it loses energy and volume due to diminishing vibration in the string. The compressor pedal boosts its electrical signal to the specified dynamic range, slightly prolonging the duration of the note. This, combined with heavy distortion and the close proximity of the guitar and the speaker cabinet, can lead to infinite sustain at higher volumes.

Other effects
Envelope follower: An envelope follower activates an effect once a designated volume is reached. One effect that uses an envelope follower is the auto-wah, which produces a "wah" effect depending on how loud or soft the notes are being played.

Guitar amplifier modeling: Amplifier modeling is a digital effect that replicates the sound of various amplifiers, most often vintage tube amplifiers and famous brands of speaker cabinets (e.g., the Ampeg SVT 8x10" bass cabinet). Sophisticated modeling effects can simulate different types of speaker cabinets (e.g., the sound of an 8x10" cabinet) and miking techniques. A rotary speaker simulator mimics the doppler and chorus effect sound of a vintage Leslie speaker system by replicating its volume and pitch modulations, overdrive capacity and phase shifts.

Pitch correction/vocal effects: Pitch correction effects use signal-processing algorithms to re-tune faulty intonation in a vocalist's performance  or create unusual vocoder-type vocal effects. One of the best known examples of this is Autotune, a software program and effect unit which can be used to both correct pitch (it moves a pitch to the nearest semitone), and add vocal effects. Some stompbox-style vocal pedals contain multiple effects, such as reverb and pitch correction.

Simulators: Simulators enable electric guitars to mimic the sound of other instruments such as acoustic guitar, electric bass and sitar. Pick up simulators used on guitars with single-coil pick ups replicate the sound of guitars with humbucker pick ups, or vice versa. A de-fretter is a bass guitar effect that simulates the sound of a fretless bass. The effect uses an envelope-controlled filter and voltage-controlled amplifier to "soften" a note's attack both in volume and timbre.

Bitcrusher filters: Bitcrushers rely on conversion of the audio signal into a digital format (ADC) and the reduction of sound fidelity by utilising bit (and sometimes sample) rates low enough to cause significant colouration and filtering within the audible frequency range.

Rotating speakers are specially constructed amplifier or loudspeakers used to create special audio effects using the Doppler effect by rotating the speakers or a sound-directing duct. The rotating speaker creates a chorus-type effect. Named after its inventor, Donald Leslie, it is particularly associated with the Hammond organ but is used with a variety of instruments as well as vocals. The Hammond/Leslie combination has become an element in many genres of music. The Leslie Speaker and the Hammond Organ brands are currently owned by Suzuki Musical Instrument Corporation. The stompbox that simulates this effect is the Uni-Vibe pedal.

The Korg Kaoss Pad is a small touchpad MIDI controller, sampler, and effects processor for audio and musical instruments, made by Korg. The Kaoss Pad's touchpad can be used to control its internal effects engine, which can be applied to a line-in signal or to samples recorded from the line-in. Effects types include pitch shifting, distortion, filtering, wah-wah, tremolo, flanging, delay, reverberation, auto-panning, gating, phasing, and ring modulation.
The Kaoss Pad can also be used as a MIDI controller.

Bass effects

Bass effects are electronic effects units that are designed for use with the low pitches created by an electric bass or for an upright bass used with a bass amp or PA system. Two examples of bass effects are fuzz bass and bass chorus.  Some bass amplifiers have built-in effects, such as overdrive or chorus. Upright bassists in jazz, folk, blues and similar genres may use a bass preamplifier, a small electronic device that matches the impedance between the piezoelectric pickup and the amp or PA system. Bass preamps also allow for the gain of the signal to be boosted or cut. Some models also offer equalization controls, a compressor, and a DI box connection.

Boutique pedals

Boutique pedals are designed by smaller, independent companies and are typically produced in limited quantities. Some may even be hand-made, with hand-soldered connections. These pedals are mainly distributed online or through mail-order, or sold in a few music stores. They are often more expensive than mass-produced pedals and offer higher-quality components, innovative designs, in-house-made knobs, and hand-painted artwork or etching. Some boutique companies focus on re-creating classic or vintage effects.

Some boutique pedal manufacturers include: Might Be Famous, BJFE, Pete Cornish, Emlyn Crowther, Death By Audio, Robert Keeley, Roger Linn, Roger Mayer, Strymon, T-Rex Engineering, ToadWorks and Z.Vex Effects.

Modification
There is also a niche market for modifying or "modding" effects. Typically, vendors provide either custom modification services or sell new effects pedals they have already modified. The Ibanez Tube Screamer, Boss DS-1, Pro Co RAT and DigiTech Whammy are some of the most often-modified effects. Common modifications include value changes in capacitors or resistors, adding true-bypass so that the effect's circuitry is no longer in the signal path, substituting higher-quality components, replacing the unit's original operational amplifiers (op-amps), or adding functions to the device, such as allowing additional control of some factor or adding another output jack.

Other pedals and rackmount units
 
Not all stompboxes and rackmounted electronic devices designed for musicians are effects. Strobe tuner and regular electronic tuner pedals indicate whether a guitar string is too sharp or flat. Stompbox-format tuner pedals route the electric signal for the instrument through the unit via a 1/4" patch cable. These pedal-style tuners usually have an output so that the signal can be plugged into a guitar amp to produce sound. Rackmount power conditioner devices deliver a voltage of the proper level and characteristics to enable equipment to function properly (e.g., by providing transient impulse protection). A rackmounted wireless receiver unit is used to enable a guitarist or bassist to move around on stage without being connected to a cable. A footswitch pedal such as the "A/B" pedal routes a guitar signal to an amplifier or enables a performer to switch between two guitars, or between two amplifiers.

Guitar amplifiers and electronic keyboards may have switch pedals for turning built-in reverb and distortion effects on and off; the pedals contain only a switch, with the circuitry for the effect being housed in the amplifier chassis. Some musicians who use rackmounted effects or laptops employ a MIDI controller pedalboard or armband remote controls to trigger sound samples, switch between different effects or control effect settings. A pedal keyboard uses pedals, but it is not an effect unit; it is a foot-operated keyboard in which the pedals are typically used to play basslines.

See also
  — a list of non-electronic audio effects
 :Category:Audio effects
 Frequency divider
 Frequency mixer
 Nonlinear filter
 Outboard gear — effects units used in the context of audio mixing
 Sound effect
 Vintage musical equipment

References

 
Electric guitars
Guitars
Sound recording
Rock music
Sound effects
Pedals